The Transnistrian Republican Bank is the central bank of Transnistria. It issues its own currency, the Transnistrian rubla and also a series of memorial gold and silver coins, among them The Outstanding People of Pridnestrovie.

Chairmen of the Pridnestrovian Republican Bank
 Vyatcheslav Zagryadsky (22 December 1992 – 1995)
 Vitaly Kanysh, acting (1995)
 Vladimir Borisov, acting (1995-1997)
 Oleg Natakhin (1997 – 13 April 1998)
 Eduard Kosovsky (13 April 1998 – 2005)
 Aleksei Melnik, acting (2005)
 Eduard Kosovsky (2005 – 16 July 2007)
 Aleksei Melnik, acting (16 July 2007 – 23 April 2008)
 Oxana Ionova (23 April 2008 – 30 December 2011)
 Olga Radulova, acting (30 December 2011 – 1 February 2012)
 Eduard Kosovsky (1 February 2012 – Incumbent)

References

External links
 Transnistrian Republican Bank 
 Pridnestrovie's own currency 

Economy of Transnistria
Central banks